Janak Joshi (born in Ahmedabad, India) is an American politician. From January 9, 2013, to January 11, 2017, Joshi represented District 16 at the Colorado House of Representatives. He previously served a two-year term in the District 14 seat from January 12, 2011, until January 9, 2013.

Education
Joshi earned his MS from the University of Northern Colorado and his MD from Gujarat University.

Elections
2016 Joshi lost to fellow Republican Larry Liston in the primary, with Liston winning 60.87% of the vote to Joshi's 39.13%. 
2012 Redistricted to District 16, and with incumbent Republican representative Larry Liston running for Colorado Senate, Joshi ran unopposed for the June 26, 2012 Republican primary, winning with 7,313 votes, and won the three-way November 6, 2012 General election with 21,781 votes (68.2%) against Libertarian candidate Michael Giallombardo and American Constitution candidate David Rawe.
2010 When District 14 Republican representative Kent Lambert ran for Colorado Senate, Joshi was unopposed for both the August 10, 2010 Republican primary, winning with 6,618 votes, and the November 2, 2010 General election, winning with 20,352 votes.

References

External links
Official page at the Colorado General Assembly
Campaign site

Year of birth missing (living people)
Living people
American politicians of Indian descent
Gujarat University alumni
Indian emigrants to the United States
Republican Party members of the Colorado House of Representatives
University of Northern Colorado alumni
21st-century American politicians
Politicians from Colorado Springs, Colorado
Asian-American people in Colorado politics
Asian conservatism in the United States